The conspiracy of Cinadon was an attempted coup d'état which took place in Sparta in 399 BC early in the reign of Eurypontid King Agesilaus II (398–358 BC). The leader was Cinadon, who was a distinguished military officer, but came from a poor family. The conspiracy aimed to break the power of the oligarchic Spartan state and its elite and give rights to poorer Spartans and to helots. Although elaborately organized, the plot was in the end betrayed to the ephors; they cracked down on the conspirators, and Cinadon himself was tortured and executed.

Conspirators 

Cinadon was a young military officer who carried out missions for the ephors; he had a scytale in his possession which was used to direct hippeis, members of the elite Spartan guard of the Spartan army. He was well educated and, because of his job, he should have been a valued and respected person likely (according to Xenophon and Aristotle) to be a member of the peers (homoioi). He was a member of the "Inferiors" (hypomeiones), Spartans who had lost their civil rights either through cowardice, or poverty (for example, the inability to pay their dues to the syssitia), as was the case for Cinadon. He aspired, as he stated in the course of his trial, "to be a Lacedaemonian inferior to no one".

He assembled other hypomeiones, of whom the most dangerous, according to Xenophon, was the seer Tisamenus, a descendant of an Elean of the same name who had received Spartan citizenship after the Greco-Persian Wars. He had also lost his civil rights, possibly also because of poverty.

Discovery of the plot
During a sacrifice presided over by King Agesilaus II, the omens proved to be very bad. Xenophon bluntly indicates that the soothsayer assisting the king foresaw "a most terrible conspiracy". Several days later, a man denounced the conspiracy of Cinadon to the ephors; he said that he had accompanied Cinadon to the agora, where Cinadon asked him to count the Spartans proper in the crowd of about 4,000 assembled there. Cinadon thus indicated that only 40 people present were peers – comprising the king, ephors, gerousia, and other full citizens, and that these 40  were significantly outnumbered. He also stated that the Spartans proper were the enemy of the vast majority of the crowd, who were therefore potential allies. The informer added that Cinadon had gathered around himself a number of hypomeiones  who also hated the Spartans: "for whenever among these classes any mention was made of Spartiatae, no one was able to conceal the fact that he would be glad to eat them raw". The informer added that while only some conspirators were armed, the rest had access to tools and implements that could serve as makeshift weapons, such as axes and sickles.

The ephors did not immediately arrest Cinadon. By means of an elaborate ruse, they sent him to the Elean frontier at Aulon in Messenia. His escort was composed of young hippeis carefully selected by their commander. An additional detachment of cavalry was available as reinforcements. Cinadon was interrogated in the field, whereupon he revealed the names of the principal co-conspirators, who were then arrested. On his return to Sparta, he was further questioned until all his accomplices were named. Cinadon and the conspirators were then bound, flogged and dragged through the city until they were dead.

When asked about the reason of his coup, Cinadon replied "in order that [I] might be inferior to no man in Lacedæmon."

Notes

Bibliography 

  E. David, "The Conspiracy of Cinadon". Athenæeum 57 (1979), p. 239–259
 Dustin A. Gish, "Spartan Justice: the Conspiracy of Kinadon in Xenophon's Hellenika," Polis, 2009, pdf accessible from https://www.academia.edu/937041/Spartan_Justice_The_Conspiracy_of_Kinadon_in_Xenophons_Hellenika_.
  J.F. Lazenby, "The Conspiracy of Cinadon reconsidered". Athenæum 55 (1977), p. 437–443
  Edmond Lévy. Sparte : histoire politique et sociale jusqu’à la conquête romaine. Seuil,  "Points Histoire" collection, Paris, 2003
  R. Vattone, "Problemi spartani. La congiura di Cinadone". RSA 12 (1982), p. 19–52.

Government of Sparta
Coup d'état attempts in Europe
Movements for civil rights
Slavery in ancient Greece
399 BC
Abolitionism in Europe